Justin D. Jacobson is an attorney and professional game designer.

Career
Justin D. Jacobson is an attorney, and was the owner and operator of Blue Devil Games, publishers of role-playing games and strategy games. He is best known as the designer of Poisoncraft: The Dark Art, Dawning Star, and Passages, and the winner of the About.com 2004 Shared Pieces Design Competition for Golem.

In 2004, Blue Devil Games was one of the seven companies working with Indie Press Revolution as a fulfillment house to serve small press publishers with their publications in terms of warehousing, selling, and shipping to customers directly. Jacobson joined with Fred Hicks and Rob Donoghue of Evil Hat Productions and Chris Hanrahan in 2008 to form the game company One Bad Egg, intending to publish high-quality PDFs for fourth edition Dungeons & Dragons which encouraged storytelling in play; however, sales were bad, and Hicks announced in September 2009 that One Bad Egg would be closing down.

Restoration Games 
In 2016 Jacobson and Rob Daviau founded Restoration Games, a tabletop game publishing company, specializing in out-of-print mass-market games from the 1960s, 1970s, 1980s, and 1990s. Their company was announced at Gen Con 2016. After allowing people to send in suggestions for what games to restore through their website, Jacobson and his team decided on Stop Thief!, Downforce (an iteration of Wolfgang Kramer's Top Race series, and Indulgence (a recreation of the card game Dragonmaster). Stop Thief was actually funded on Kickstarter where it raised over $100,000. Jacobson's next foray into Kickstarter was bringing back the classic Fireball Island as Fireball Island: The Curse of Vul-Kar. On Kickstarter it raised over $2.8million with over 23,000  backers. The third game funded on Kickstarter for Jacobson and Restoration is their biggest to date. The game is called Return to Dark Tower which is a sequel to the legendary Dark Tower that was released in 1981. The sequel raised over $4million from over 23,000 backers. Restoration and Justin's most popular non kickstarter based game is called Unmatched which is based on the 2002 release Star Wars Epic Duels. They produce this game along with Mondo. To date there have been 30 characters released. These releases range from licensed 1 character boxes, such as Bruce Lee, to box sets with 4 public domain characters like Cobble & Fog, featuring Dracula, Invisible Man, Jekyll &Hyde, and Sherlock Holmes. The 2 most recent releases are part of a licensed deal with Marvel, with 2 more sets to come in the future. In 2020 Justin and Restoration held a contest for fans of the game to create their own characters. These have yet to be released. Regarding Justin's future goals he said in a 2021 interview that his dream character for Unmatched is Muhammad Ali and his dream IP is James Bond.

References

External links
Blue Devil Games website
Dawning Star website
Restoration Games website

Board game designers
Living people
Role-playing game designers
1970 births